Taft was a census-designated place (CDP) in St. Charles Parish, Louisiana, United States, located on the west bank of the Mississippi River. According to the 2000 census, Taft had a total population of zero.

History
Taft is the location of a phosphate processing facility owned by The Mosaic Company (formerly IMC-Agrico); the Dow/Union Carbide Taft/Star Petrochemical Plant, which produces a variety of organic chemicals such as acrolein, acrylic acid, and acetaldehyde; and part of the Waterford Nuclear Generating Station owned by Entergy Corporation. Virtually all of the land is now zoned as heavy industrial.

Taft was the original site of Our Lady of the Holy Rosary Catholic Church, which served Taft, Killona and Hahnville. The church was built in 1877, and in 1963, it moved to Hahnville. The cemetery is still in Taft and is still used as a burial ground by the church. It is bounded on three sides by the Dow chemical facilities.

Population was 700 when the first post office opened in 1905, and it remained in operation until 1967. By 1977, only 36 people lived in Taft.

In December, 1982, a major explosion occurred at the Union Carbide facility about 30 miles from New Orleans, causing nearly 17,000 people to evacuate.

Geography 
The CDP is located on the Mississippi River.

Demographics 

As of the census of 2000, there were no people living in the CDP.

See also
List of ghost towns in Louisiana

References

External links
IMC Agrico suspends phosphate production in Taft

Former census-designated places in Louisiana
Ghost towns in St. Charles Parish, Louisiana
Populated places disestablished in 2000
2000 disestablishments in Louisiana